Mississippi State Axion Search is the first of its kind light shining through the wall experiment designed to operate using a continuous radio wave emitter as the source of photons. The experiment contains a radio source and a set of detectors separated by a wall. The aim of the experiment is to limit the mass and coupling constants of an axion like particle or a para photon by looking at the photons on the dark side of the tuned cavity. The experiment is projected to be completed by 2016.

Collaboration 

The collaboration currently includes members from the following institutions;
 Mississippi State University

References 

Particle experiments
Mississippi State University